PSIS may refer to:

Posterior superior iliac spine, part of the human hip bone
PSIS Semarang, an Indonesian football team
PSIS Co-operative, a financial services co-operative based in New Zealand